The Laird, Norton Company Building is a historic commercial building in Winona, Minnesota, United States.  From its completion in 1918 to 1958 it was the headquarters of the Laird, Norton Company, the largest and most successful logging firm based in Winona.  It was listed on the National Register of Historic Places in 2014 for its local significance in the theme of commerce.  It was nominated for its association with the Minnesota lumber industry.  The Laird, Norton Company was founded in the 1850s in Winona, a strategic river and rail hub, and pioneered the use of line yards, lumber yards established along railroad lines to sell raw building material to inland settlers.

See also
 National Register of Historic Places listings in Winona County, Minnesota

References

1918 establishments in Minnesota
Buildings and structures in Winona, Minnesota
Commercial buildings completed in 1918
Commercial buildings on the National Register of Historic Places in Minnesota
Headquarters in the United States
Logging in the United States
National Register of Historic Places in Winona County, Minnesota
Renaissance Revival architecture in Minnesota